Seales is an English language surname.  People with this surname include:

 Amanda Seales (b. 1981), American actress
 Franklyn Seales (1952-1990), American actor
 Jayden Seales, Trindadian cricketer
 Jim Seales, lead guitar in Shenandoah (band)
 Joe Seales, founder of the Right Side Broadcasting Network, and his brother Jacob Seales, composer of "The American Dreamer"
 Lecretia Seales (1973-2015), New Zealand lawyer and physician-assisted dying activist
 Marc Seales, American jazz pianist
 Sugar Ray Seales (b. 1952), American boxer

See also 
 Seale (disambiguation)
 Searles (surname)

Patronymic surnames